South Herefordshire was one of nine local government districts of the English county of Hereford and Worcester from 1974 to 1998.

History
South Herefordshire District was formed on 1 April 1974 as part of a general reorganisation of local administration in England and Wales under the Local Government Act 1972. It was formed from part of the administrative county of Herefordshire, and covered the area of four former districts, which were abolished at the same time:
Dore and Bredwardine Rural District
Ross-on-Wye Urban District
Hereford Rural District
Ross and Whitchurch Rural District.
The district entirely surrounded the district of Hereford.

Following a review by the Local Government Commission for England, South Herefordshire and the county of Hereford and Worcester were abolished in 1998. South Herefordshire was combined with the areas of City of Hereford, most of the District of Leominster, and part of the District of Malvern Hills to form a new unitary authority of Herefordshire.

Parishes
The district comprised the following civil parishes:.

Abbey Dore
Aconbury
Allensmore
Aston Ingham
Bacton
Ballingham
Bartestree 
Bolstone
Brampton Abbotts
Bredwardine
Breinton
Bridstow
Brockhampton 
Burghill 
Callow
Clehonger 
Clifford
Craswall
Credenhill 
Cusop 
Dewsall
Dinedor 
Dinmore
Dormington
Dorstone 
Dulas
Eaton Bishop
Ewyas Harold
Fownhope 
Foy
Ganarew
Garway
Goodrich
Grafton
Hampton Bishop

Harewood
Haywood 
Hentland
Holme Lacy
Holmer and Pipe
Hope Mansell
How Caple
Kenchester
Kenderchurch
Kentchurch and Kilpeck
Kings Caple
Kingstone
Lea 
Linton
Little Birch
Little Dewchurch 
Llancillo 
Llandinabo
Llangarron 
Llanrothal
Llanveynoe
Llanwarne
Longtown
Lower Bullingham
Lugwardine
Lyde 
Madley
Marden 
Marstow 
Michaelchurch Escley
Mordiford
Moreton-on-Lugg
Much Birch
Much Dewchurch
Newton

Orcop
Pencoyd 
Peterchurch
Peterstow 
Preston Wynne
Ross-on-Wye (Town)
Ross Rural
Rowlstone 
St Devereux
St Margarets
St Weonards
Sellack 
Sollers Hope
Stoke Edith
Stretton Sugwas 
Sutton 
Thruxton
Tretire with Michaelchurch
Treville  
Turnastone 
Tyberton 
Upton Bishop
Vowchurch 
Walford 
Walterstone 
Wellington
Welsh Bicknor
Welsh Newton
Westhide
Weston Beggard
Weston-under-Penyard
Whitchurch 
Withington 
Wormbridge 
Yatton

Political control
The first elections to the council were held in 1973, initially operating as a shadow authority before coming into its powers on 1 April 1974. Political control of the council from 1974 until its abolition in 1998 was always held by independent councillors:

Council elections
1973 South Herefordshire District Council election
1976 South Herefordshire District Council election
1979 South Herefordshire District Council election (New ward boundaries)
1980 South Herefordshire District Council election
1982 South Herefordshire District Council election
1983 South Herefordshire District Council election
1984 South Herefordshire District Council election
1986 South Herefordshire District Council election (District boundary changes took place but the number of seats remained the same)
1987 South Herefordshire District Council election
1988 South Herefordshire District Council election (District boundary changes took place but the number of seats remained the same)
1990 South Herefordshire District Council election
1991 South Herefordshire District Council election (New ward boundaries)
1992 South Herefordshire District Council election
1994 South Herefordshire District Council election
1995 South Herefordshire District Council election
1996 South Herefordshire District Council election

References

History of Herefordshire
Former non-metropolitan districts of Hereford and Worcester
 
Council elections in Hereford and Worcester
District council elections in England